FK Kozara is a Swedish football club located in Gothenburg.

Background
FK Kozara currently plays in Division 4 Göteborg A which is the sixth tier of Swedish football. They play their home matches at the Bläsebovallen and Gamlestadsvallen in Göteborg.

The club is affiliated to Göteborgs Fotbollförbund.

Season to season

Footnotes

External links
 FK Kozara – Official website

Football clubs in Gothenburg
Football clubs in Västra Götaland County
Kozara